Frank Hunter and Bill Tilden were the defending champions, but lost in the semifinals to Jack Hawkes and Gerald Patterson.

Jacques Brugnon and Henri Cochet defeated Hawkes and Patterson in the final, 13–11, 6–4, 6–4 to win the gentlemen's doubles tennis title at the 1928 Wimbledon Championship.

Seeds

  Frank Hunter /  Bill Tilden (semifinals)
  Jacques Brugnon /  Henri Cochet (champions)
  John Hennessey /  George Lott (semifinals)
  Jack Hawkes /  Gerald Patterson (final)

Draw

Finals

Top half

Section 1

Section 2

Bottom half

Section 3

Section 4

References

External links

Men's Doubles
Wimbledon Championship by year – Men's doubles